Les femmes vengées, ou Les feintes infidélités (Avenged Women, or Feigned Infidelity) is a one-act opéra comique by François-André Danican Philidor to a libretto by Michel-Jean Sedaine after Jean de La Fontaine's "Les rémois" from the third part (1671) of his collection of ribald short stories, Contes et nouvelles en vers. It was first performed on 20 March 1775 at the Comédie-Italienne (Hôtel de Bourgogne, Paris.

The plot of the opera is similar to Così fan tutte which W. A. Mozart, who was in Paris during the first performances of Philidor's opera, composed in 1790.

Recordings
 Opera Lafayette, 2015, Ryan Brown conducting

References

Further reading
 "Review of Opera Lafayette recording by Judith Malafronte, Opera News, vol. 80, no. 8, February 2016

External links
 Libretto,  1787 

Operas by François-André Danican Philidor
1775 operas
Opéras comiques
One-act operas
French-language operas
Operas based on literature
Operas